The men's freestyle 61 kilograms is a competition featured at the 2015 World Wrestling Championships, and was held in Las Vegas, United States on 11 September.

This freestyle wrestling competition consisted of a single-elimination tournament, with a repechage used to determine the winners of two bronze medals.

Results
Legend
F — Won by fall

Final

Top half

Bottom half

Repechage

References

Men's freestyle 61 kg